Lourens River Protected Natural Environment is a section of protected land along the Lourens River in the Helderberg region, South Africa.

Its upper reaches are relatively undisturbed and are privately owned. However, the lower part of the river flows through developed areas as well as past fynbos and plantations of invasive alien trees. This natural area is threatened by pollution as well as by invasive alien weeds such as Kikuyu grass and the Black Wattle tree.

The Dick Dent Bird Sanctuary is contained within the protected area. Beside the protected area is the Vergelegen Nature Reserve. West of the protected environment is the Helderberg Nature Reserve.

See also
 Biodiversity of Cape Town
 List of nature reserves in Cape Town

References

Further reading

Nature reserves in Cape Town
Protected areas of the Western Cape